WD repeat domain 76 is a protein that in humans is encoded by the WDR76 gene.

References

Further reading